Ludwig Lewisohn (May 30, 1882 – December 31, 1955) was a novelist, literary critic, the drama critic for The Nation and then its associate editor. He was the editor of the New Palestine, an American Zionist journal. He taught at the University of Wisconsin and at Ohio State University as well as serving as professor of German and Comparative Literature at Brandeis University.  Lewisohn produced some 40 full-length fiction and non-fiction books, nearly as many translations, wrote numerous magazine and journal articles and edited countless other written works.

Biography
Lewisohn was born in Berlin, Germany to a highly assimilated, upper-middle class Jewish family. His parents Jacques Lewisohn and Minna (Eloesser) immigrated to the United States in 1890. The family settled in St. Matthews, South Carolina and then in 1892 moved to Charleston. Lewisohn's mother was the daughter of a rabbi, but when the family moved to America they settled in an area where there was not a practicing Jewish congregation. He was sent to a Methodist Sunday school to improve his English. He integrated well into the Methodist community and its church and subsequently became an active Methodist.  After graduating with honors from the College of Charleston, he went to Columbia University in 1902 to continue with graduate work.  He received the degree of A.M. in 1903.

In 1904 he was told by his advisers that a Jew would never be hired to teach English literature at an American university. The bitter irony in this advice led Lewisohn to return to Judaism and he became an outspoken critic of American Jewish assimilation. In 1948 Lewisohn was among the founding faculty members of Brandeis University where he taught until his death.

Following his graduation from Columbia, Lewisohn worked for Doubleday, Page & Co. in New York as a member of the editorial staff. The following year, 1905, he left Doubleday to become a free-lance magazine writer. In 1910, with the strong recommendation of his close friend William Ellery Leonard he became an instructor of German at the University of Wisconsin. He remained there for one year and then accepted the position of professor of German language and literature at Ohio State University. He served at the University until 1917 when war time sentiments forced his separation. Upon leaving Ohio State University Lewisohn became drama critic at the Nation and then was promoted to associate editor in 1920. He continued to write for The Nation until 1924. He translated from the German into English works of Gerhart Hauptmann, Jakob Wassermann and Franz Werfel.

In 1943 he became the editor of The New Palestine (magazine), working with them until 1948. He then began his work at Brandeis University.

Lewisohn was a member of the Jewish Academy of Arts and Sciences and was an honorary secretary of the Zionist Organization of America. Lewisohn
strongly supported the Zionist cause and he lectured and wrote widely on its behalf.

Personal life

When he first came to Columbia, Lewisohn had an affair with George Sylvester Viereck. He was married three times; to Mary Arnold in 1906, to Edna Manley in 1940 and to Louise Wolk in 1944. His first two marriages ended in divorce and he was survived in death by his third wife. Lewisohn also had a son, James Elias Lewisohn, by Thelma Spear, a concert singer with whom he had lived and had a relationship with for many years. Spear actually burst in on his wedding to Edna Manley at a Baltimore synagogue, insisting that he first marry and then divorce her or she would sue him for bigamy.  Lewisohn died in Miami Beach, Florida on December 31, 1955.

Selective Bibliography
 The Broken Snare (1908)
 A Night in Alexandria (1909)
 Up Stream (1922)
 The Creative Life (1924)
 Israel (1925)
 The Case of Mr. Crump (1926)
 The Island Within (1928)
 Expression in America (1931)
 The Last Days of Shylock (1931) Illustrated by Arthur Szyk
 Rebirth (1935)
 Trumpet of Jubilee (1937)
 He commented on: "The Jew and the Book", in Samuel Caplan and Harold U. Ribalow, ed., The Great Jewish Books (New York , Horizon, 1952), pp. 11–17.

References

External links 

 
 
 Ludwig Lewisohn Collection, 1883-1955
 Rebirth - A Book of Modern Jewish Thought
 Ludwig Lewisohn short biographie (German)
 Tablet Magazine: Comeback Kid
 Jewish Ideas Daily: Retrieving American Fiction: Ludwig Lewisohn

1882 births
1955 deaths
20th-century American novelists
American male novelists
American translators
German emigrants to the United States
Brandeis University faculty
College of Charleston alumni
Columbia University alumni
Writers from Charleston, South Carolina
Novelists from Massachusetts
American Zionists
Jewish American novelists
American people of German-Jewish descent
Analysands of A. A. Brill
20th-century translators
Novelists from South Carolina
20th-century American male writers